Daniel Davis (born February 22, 1989), known professionally as Daniel D., is an American violinist and producer. He presents improvisational violin performances, both live and in music videos found on his eponymous YouTube channel, which he created in 2007.

Early life
Daniel was born in Charleston, South Carolina. He has a younger sister named Faith (born 1992) who is a folk singer-songwriter and blogger. He attended Charleston County School of the Arts in Charleston, SC. At 12 years of age he took an after-school class to learn the violin, but only progressed once he had private teachers. Daniel named Miri Ben Ari his major musical influence.

Career

2004-2006: Early Years
At the age of 16 Daniel started performing professionally. A friend of his dad hired him for an event and at that point he noticed he can make a living of playing his violin. He started playing local events around his hometown Charleston, SC. 
In 2005 Daniel was the Scholarship Winner of "Summer In the City 2005" and studied thereafter at the Juilliard School of Music in Summer 2005.

2007-2009: Youtube
In 2007, at the age of 21, Daniel began posting videos on Internet websites YouTube and WorldStarHipHop. Daniel combines hip hop, pop, and classical music with the violin. 
2007 was an eventful year for Daniel, he won the Apollo Award in New York City and was the opening performer for Presidential Candidate Barack Obama on his Campaign Rally in South Carolina.

2017-present: New Routes

In September 2017 Daniel D. took a new route with Facebook Live streaming where he constantly has well over 1000 people watching. About at the same time he opened his first Online Store www.DanielDMusicStore.com where you can purchase his Music as well as Merchandise.

Discography

Albums
Play For Me (2009)
Serenade (2010)
Epic Sounds (2012)
SonRise (2013)
Remixed (2014)
Sounds Of Christmas (2015)
Tis So Sweet (2017)
Women In Music (2018)
Daniel D. plays MJ (2019)

See also
 List of popular music violinists

References

External links 
 Official website
 Daniel D. on Facebook
 Daniel D. on YouTube

1989 births
Living people
American male violinists
Hip hop violinists
Musicians from Charleston, South Carolina
21st-century American violinists
21st-century American male musicians
21st-century African-American musicians
20th-century African-American people